Miroshnyk or Miroshnik is a Ukrainian language occupational surname literally meaning "miller".  Notable people with the surname include:

Meg Miroshnik, American playwright
Roman Miroshnyk,  Ukrainian football player

References

Ukrainian-language surnames
Occupational surnames

uk:Мірошник (прізвище)